Sweetheart ( is a 2019 French comedy-drama film directed by Lisa Azuelos.

Cast 
 Sandrine Kiberlain - Héloïse
 Thaïs Alessandrin - Jade
 Victor Belmondo - Théo 
 Mickaël Lumière - Louis
 Camille Claris - Lola
 Kyan Khojandi - Paul

References

External links 

2019 comedy-drama films
French comedy-drama films
2010s French films